Paula Gunn Allen (October 24, 1939 – May 29, 2008) was a Native American poet, literary critic, activist, professor, and novelist. Of mixed-race European-American, Native American, and Arab-American descent, she identified with her mother's people, the Laguna Pueblo and childhood years. She drew from its oral traditions for her fiction poetry and also wrote numerous essays on its themes. She edited four collections of Native American traditional stories and contemporary works and wrote two biographies of Native American women.

In addition to her literary work, in 1986 she published a major study on the role of women in American Indian traditions, arguing that Europeans had de-emphasized the role of women in their accounts of native life because of their own patriarchal societies. It stimulated other scholarly work by feminist and Native American writers.

Biography
Born Paula Marie Francis in Albuquerque, New Mexico Allen grew up in Cubero, New Mexico, a Spanish-Mexican land grant village bordering the Laguna Pueblo reservation. Of mixed Laguna, Sioux, Scottish, and Lebanese-American descent, Allen always identified most closely with the Laguna, among whom she spent her childhood and upbringing.

Her Lebanese-American father, Elias Lee Francis, owned a local store, the Cubero Trading Company, and later served as the lieutenant governor of New Mexico from 1967 to 1970. Her brother, Lee Francis, was a Laguna Pueblo-Anishinaabe poet, storyteller, and educator.

Allen first went to a mission school and graduated in 1957 from a boarding school called the "Sisters of Charity" located in Albuquerque.

Allen received a BA and MFA in creative writing from the University of Oregon. She earned a PhD at the University of New Mexico, where she worked as a professor and began research on tribal religions. As a student at the University of New Mexico, she reached out to a poetry professor, Robert Creeley, for poetic advice. He directed her to the work of Charles Olson, Allen Ginsberg, and Denise Levertov, who all had strong influences on her work. Later, while a student at University of Oregon she had Ralph Salisbury as a poetry professor, who is of a Cherokee tribe and also had a heavy influence on Paula Gunn Allen.

Professor Allen taught at Fort Lewis College in Colorado, the College of San Mateo, San Diego State University, San Francisco State University, the University of New Mexico, Albuquerque, the University of California, Berkeley, and the University of California, Los Angeles. She taught at UCLA from 1990 to 1999 as a professor of the English department and the UCLA American Indian Studies Center.

Anthropological writings 
Based on her own experiences and her study of Native American cultures, Paula Gunn Allen wrote The Sacred Hoop: Recovering the Feminine in American Indian Traditions (1986). This groundbreaking work argued that the dominant cultural view of Native American societies was biased and that European explorers and colonizers understood Native Peoples through the patriarchal lens. Gunn described the central role women played in many Native American cultures, including roles in political leadership, which were either downplayed or missed entirely by explorers and scholars from male-dominated European cultures. Allen argued that most Native Americans at the time of European contact were matrifocal and egalitarian with only a small percentage reflecting the European patriarchal pattern.

Allen's arguments and research were criticized by more mainstream scholars, as well as by author and critic Gerald Vizenor, who accused her of "a simple reversal of essentialism".
 The American Indian Movement ("AIM") has itself been criticized by feminists as being sexist. In spite of this, Allen's book and subsequent work has proved highly influential, encouraging other feminist studies of Native American cultures and literature, including an emergence of Indigenous feminism. It remains a classic text of Native American Studies and Women's Studies programs.

Literary career
Allen is well known as a novelist, poet and short story writer.  Her work drew heavily on the Pueblo tales of Grandmother Spider and the Corn Maiden. It is noted for its strong political connotations. Critics have noted that Leslie Marmon Silko, also of Laguna descent, also draws on these traditional tales.

Her novel, The Woman Who Owned The Shadows (1983), features the woman Ephanie Atencio, the mixed-blood daughter of a mixed-blood mother who struggles with social exclusion and the obliteration of self.

As a poet, Allen published a collection of more than 30 years of work: Life Is a Fatal Disease: Collected Poems 1962-1995, judged to be her most successful. Allen's work is often categorized as belonging to the Native American Renaissance, but the author rejects the label.

Awards
Allen was awarded an American Book Award in 1990 by the Before Columbus Foundation, for editing short stories by American Indian writers, the Hubbell Medal, the Native American Prize for Literature, the Susan Koppelman Award, and a Lifetime Achievement Award by the Native Writers' Circle of the Americas in 2001. In 1999, the Modern Language Association awarded her the J. Hubbell Medal for American Literature.

Personal life
Allen's father, E. Lee Francis, was Lebanese American and her mother, was Scotch-Laguna Pueblo. One of Allen's sisters, Carol Lee Sanchez, was a Laguna writer. She was also related to Leslie Marmon Silko. Allen was in two different marriages and divorced both times. 
Two of Allen's children preceded her in death, Fuad Ali Allen, and Eugene John Brown. Son Fuad Ali Allen died in 1972 and her other son Eugene John Brown died in 2001. She was survived by two children, Lauralee Brown and Suleiman Allen.

Bibliography
 
The Woman Who Owned The Shadows (1983), novel

Poetry
America the Beautiful: The Final Poems of Paula Gunn Allen (2010)Life is a Fatal Disease: Collected Poems 1962-1995 (1997)Skins and Bones: Poems 1979-1987 (1988)Shadow Country (1982)A Cannon Between My Knees (1981)Star Child: Poems (1981)Coyote's Daylight Trip (1978)Blind Lion Poems (The Blind Lion) (1974)

AcademicOff the Reservation: Reflections on Boundary-Busting Border-Crossing Loose Canons (1998)Womanwork: Bridges: Literature across Cultures McGraw–Hill (1994)Grandmothers of the Light: A Medicine Women's Sourcebook (1991)The Sacred Hoop: Recovering the Feminine in American Indian Traditions (1986)Studies in American Indian Literature: Critical Essays and Course Designs (1983)

BiographyPocahontas: Medicine Woman, Spy, Entrepreneur, Diplomat (2004)As Long As the Rivers Flow: The Stories of Nine Native Americans (1996)

Edited collections and anthologiesHozho: Walking in Beauty: Short Stories by American Indian Writers (2001)Song of the Turtle: American Indian Literature, 1974-1994 (1996)Voice of the Turtle: American Indian Literature, 1900-1970 (1994)Spider Woman's Granddaughters: Traditional Tales and Contemporary Writing by Native American Women (1989)

Anthology contributionsThe Serpent's Tongue: Prose, Poetry, and Art of the New Mexican Pueblos, ed. Nancy Wood. (1997)Living the Spirit: A Gay American Indian Anthology, ed. Will Roscoe. (1988)

References

Further reading

Archival resources
 Harper's Anthology Papers, 1984-1988 (440 items) are housed at the University of Michigan University Library.
 Persephone Press Records, 1974-1983  (8 cartons, 1 oversize box, 1 folio photograph folder) are housed at Harvard University Radcliffe Institute for Advanced Study.

External links

 Memorial Site for Paula Gunn Allen
 Official Paula Gunn Allen Site, Hanksville Storytellers
 Paula Gunn Allen, Voices in the Gaps'', University of Minnesota

1939 births
2008 deaths
20th-century Native Americans
20th-century American women writers
20th-century American novelists
20th-century American poets
American Book Award winners
American feminist writers
American people of Lebanese descent
American women novelists
American women poets
Laguna Pueblo
Lesbian feminists
American lesbian writers
LGBT Native Americans
LGBT people from New Mexico
Native American activists
Native American feminists
Native American novelists
Native American poets
Native American women writers
Pueblo people
University of Oregon alumni
Writers from Albuquerque, New Mexico
20th-century Native American women
21st-century Native Americans
20th-century American LGBT people
21st-century Native American women